Phaea miniata is a species of beetle in the family Cerambycidae. It was described by Francis Polkinghorne Pascoe in 1858. It is known from Venezuela and Mexico.

References

miniata
Beetles described in 1858